Linda Robersy Moncada Fonseca (born 7 October 1995) is a Honduran footballer who plays as a forward for CD Olimpia and the Honduras women's national team.

Club career
Moncada has played for Olimpia in Honduras.

International career
Moncada made her senior debut for Honduras on 19 November 2021. She also capped during the 2022 CONCACAF W Championship qualification.

References

1995 births
Living people
Honduran women's footballers
Women's association football forwards
C.D. Olimpia players
Honduras women's international footballers